Aylesbury railway station is a railway station in Aylesbury, Buckinghamshire, England, on the London–Aylesbury line from  via Amersham. It was the terminus for London Underground's Metropolitan line until the service was cut back to Amersham in 1961. The station was also known as Aylesbury Town under the management of British Railways from  until the 1960s.

History
The first station on the site was opened in 1863 by the Wycombe Railway, which in 1867 was taken over by the Great Western Railway.  In 1868 the Aylesbury & Buckingham Railway (later part of the Metropolitan Railway) reached Aylesbury.

When opened, the line to Aylesbury from Princes Risborough was broad gauge. To avoid mixed gauge track when the standard gauge Aylesbury and Buckingham arrived at the station in 1868, the section to Princes Risborough was converted to standard gauge, and therefore until the rest of the Wycombe Railway was converted in 1870 there was no access to the rest of the GWR system. The GWR provided motive power and trains to both the Wycombe Railway and the A&B, and ran a shuttle service from Princes Risborough to Verney Junction.

A broad gauge single-road engine shed was provided from the station's opening in 1863; the shed was doubled in length within a year or two, and in 1870 became a two-road shed with a lean-to added to the east side of the original shed. By 1892, with the arrival of the Metropolitan Railway, the shed was converted to a north-light two-road shed using the west wall of the original broad gauge shed and the east wall of the 1870 extension.

The Metropolitan Railway opened from Chalfont Road in 1892 to a separate station named Aylesbury (Brook Street) adjacent to the GWR station. It closed in 1894 when services were diverted to the GW station.

Aylesbury Railway Disaster of 1904

Because the station had been a terminus for the Metropolitan Railway the original junction layout on the route to London Marylebone included a sharp curve. This became inconvenient once some Great Central trains began to run non-stop through Aylesbury from 1899 onwards. Rather than change the junction layout to suit faster trains, a  speed restriction was applied to the curve.

On 23 December 1904 at about 3:38 a.m. this curve was the site of the Aylesbury Railway Disaster. The 2:45 a.m. Great Central express newspaper train from London Marylebone consisting of a locomotive, tender, and ten vehicles—three coaches, an assortment of six fish, meat and parcel vans, and a brake van—failed to slow for the curve, and was completely derailed. The driver of the train, Joseph Barnshaw was seriously injured and died the next day.

There was heavy fog at the time of the accident, and at the subsequent Board of Trade inquiry there was some doubt as to how well driver Barnshaw knew the route. What the inquiry did not touch on was that there had been a history of fast running of these newspaper trains, which had become an important traffic for the Great Central Railway. This dated back to the Boer War which had ended only two years earlier. The Manchester Guardians stance on the Boer War had resulted in significant drops in circulation. London newspapers, led by the Daily Mail, saw a significant business opportunity in the Manchester area, and sought to get their morning newspapers to Manchester in time to win a share of this market. These trains recorded fast times for the era, including an authenticated timing of 220 minutes for the  journey including stops.

Afterwards in 1908 the station was reconstructed and tracks at the curve were realigned.

Station buildings
The original station had one platform with a brick-built station building a canopy projected from the building over the platform supported on cast iron pillars. The cost of the station building was shared between the Wycombe Railway and the Aylesbury and Buckingham Railway; the original plans are in Aylesbury local records office.

The current station buildings date from 1926, when the station was extensively rebuilt again—this time by the London and North Eastern Railway. Until nationalisation in 1948, Aylesbury station was operated by a joint committee whose constituents were also joint committees: the GWR & GCR Joint and the Metropolitan and GCR Joint; although the LNER had taken on the role of the former Great Central Railway in all three joint committees, these committees were not renamed.

Motive Power Depot
The Wycombe Railway opened a single-road engine shed fifty feet in length to the west of the station in 1863. This was extended to the rear shortly after and enlarged to a two-road shed by the Great Western Railway in 1871, around 1893 the saw tooth roof was added on the original walls; it was closed on 16 June 1962 and was demolished in 1967.

A wooden water tank was positioned outside the locomotive shed from the station's opening, being replaced by a standard GWR water tank with decorative supports and coaling stage underneath in 1899; this itself was replaced by a Braithwaite tank in the mid-1950s.

The first mention of a locomotive at Aylesbury was of the broad-gauge loco Giraffe in 1863, a member of the Sun class.

1930s to the present day

Aylesbury was also on the Metropolitan Railway (later Metropolitan line) and through trains from Baker Street to  operated until 1936. From 1948 to 1961 Aylesbury was the terminus of the Met's main line, on which trains had to change between electric and steam locomotives at Rickmansworth. Following electrification from Rickmansworth to Amersham, Aylesbury was no longer served by London Underground trains. In 1966 British Railways closed the Great Central Main Line north of Aylesbury. Aylesbury was thus left with commuter services to London only. From the 1960s until the 1980s, passenger trains at Aylesbury were almost exclusively operated by British Rail Class 115 diesel multiple units.

By the 1980s the lines serving Aylesbury were in a poor state. Aylesbury station itself was run down and needed refurbishment. Network SouthEast decided to refurbish the lines out of Marylebone, and Aylesbury received a new waiting room, new toilets and better lighting. Platform 4 was closed and the car park was extended. A new driver's staff room was established on platform 3 and a new heavy maintenance depot was built just north of the station. Aylesbury became the headquarters of the operational side of the Chiltern Line. (For more information, see: Chiltern Line Modernisation)

On 14 December 2008  of the line north of Aylesbury was reopened for passenger service, with regular passenger services running north of the station for the first time since 1966. This serves the new  station, which is situated on the northwestern outskirts of Aylesbury and is operated by Chiltern Railways.

Present layout
Aylesbury station is laid out for through traffic, with hourly trains to/from Aylesbury Vale Parkway and waste freight trains to the landfill site at Calvert heading north. In addition there is a major repair and maintenance depot just north of the station, and several sidings.

There are three platforms. Platform 3 gives access to Amersham and London Marylebone only, whilst platform 1 gives access to Princes Risborough and London Marylebone via  only. Platform 2 can serve both routes. There was a bay platform (platform 4) that served as the terminus for Metropolitan trains and several freight sidings but the car park now lies on the trackbed and bike racks occupy the platform. The goods depot was to the west of the station and was demolished in the 1960s. Modern apartments now occupy the site.

The station is managed by Chiltern Railways, which has recently had automatic ticket gates installed. There are two FastTicket self-service ticket machines accepting cash and cards, a permit to travel machine and two ticket windows. There is a taxi rank outside the station. From 21 January 2008 the taxi rank was moved to the car park for 52 weeks as a result of major engineering work on the new Southcourt Bridge and the new Station Boulevard.

Seven first generation DMUs built in the late 1950s are based at Aylesbury. These units are jointly used by Chiltern Railways and Network Rail for route learning and Sandite duties. One unit was used solely for passenger services until 2017 to and from Princes Risborough.

All three station platforms have step-free access, with access to platforms 1 and 2 via a pair of lifts.

Connection to Winslow, Milton Keynes, Bedford and Cambridge

In 2004, a 'regional planning guidance' report by consultants for Buckinghamshire County Council concerning the development of Aylesbury Vale recommended further expansion of rail services to Bletchley and Bedford. The Department for Transport endorsed the scheme in December 2017, with opening planned for 2024. However, in November 2020 it was reported that the Aylesbury leg may be dropped from the first phase. 

In March 2021, the East West Rail Company announced that its opening plans for East West Rail have changed, notably deferring indefinitely a connection to Aylesbury.

Services
All services at Aylesbury are operated by Chiltern Railways. Most services operate to London Marylebone although services can take one of two routes running via either  on the London-Aylesbury line or via  the Aylesbury–Princes Risborough line,  and the Chiltern Main Line.

The current off-peak service is:
 2 tph to London Marylebone via 
 1 tph to London Marylebone via 
 1 tph to 

On Sundays, the services on the London-Aylesbury line are reduced to 1 train per hour.

During Bank Holidays in Spring and Summer there is a frequent shuttle service to Quainton Road.

Onward connections
Aylesbury bus station is a two-minute walk from the station. Buses, the majority of which are operated by Arriva Shires & Essex, depart to several destinations across Buckinghamshire, Hertfordshire and Oxfordshire, including Stoke Mandeville Hospital, Milton Keynes, Oxford, Tring, Watford, Luton and Leighton Buzzard. Bus departure times are displayed on screens outside the rail station's departure lounge as well as at the bus station itself.

The Aylesbury - Princes Risborough rail link offers connections to High Wycombe, Bicester, Banbury and Birmingham. This route was greatly improved by "Project Evergreen" - the re-dualing and speeding-up of Marylebone - Risborough - Birmingham track and services. Since 2015 Risborough has also had access to direct Oxford trains via a new junction at Bicester Village.

See also
 Aylesbury High Street railway station

Notes

References

External links

Chiltern Railways
East West Rail Consortium
Station on navigable O.S. map

Metropolitan line stations
Railway stations in Buckinghamshire
DfT Category D stations
Former Great Western and Great Central Joint Railway stations
Former Metropolitan and Great Central Joint Railway stations
Railway stations in Great Britain opened in 1863
Railway stations served by Chiltern Railways
Aylesbury
East West Rail